Ernest Schultz (January 29, 1931 in Dalhunden, Bas-Rhin – September 20, 2013) was a French football striker.

References

 Profile

1931 births
2013 deaths
Sportspeople from Bas-Rhin
French people of German descent
French footballers
France international footballers
Association football forwards
Ligue 1 players
Olympique Lyonnais players
US Boulogne players
1954 FIFA World Cup players
French football managers
US Boulogne managers
Footballers from Alsace